St. Ignatius of Loyola College is a private Catholic primary and secondary school and vocational training college, located in Alcalá de Henares, Madrid, Spain. The school was founded by the Society of Jesus in 1953.

History 
The history of Colegio San Ignacio began in 1955 with the construction of a school of philosophy for Jesuits studying for the priesthood; the primary school had preceded it in 1953. With the arrival of the philosophate came the Jesuit archives, which since 2014 have included most of the archival materials of the Jesuits in Spain. The present building was opened in 1971 when the school of philosophy moved to Madrid.

The school includes early childhood, primary, and ESO, as well as vocational training in electricity and electronics. There are 532 students served by 42 teachers.

In 1970 the future Pope Francis would stay with the Jesuit fathers in Alcalá de Henares while completing his final year of spiritual studies leading to solemn profession of vows in the Society of Jesus.

See also

 Catholic Church in Spain
 Education in Spain
 List of Jesuit schools

References

Further reading
 Manuel Serrano y Sanz, San Ignacio De Loyola En Alcalá De Henares: Estudio Histórico, South Carolina: Nabu Press, 2012, 58 pp. 

Schools in Madrid
Jesuit secondary schools in Spain
Vocational education in Spain
Jesuit primary schools in Spain
Educational institutions established in 1955
1955 establishments in Spain